Advances in High Energy Physics a peer-reviewed open-access scientific journal publishing research on high energy physics. It is published by Hindawi Publishing Corporation.

The journal was established in 2007 and publishes original research articles as well as review articles in all fields of high energy physics. The journal is dedicated to both theoretical and experimental research." It  is part of the SCOAP3 initiative.

References

External links 
 

English-language journals
Hindawi Publishing Corporation academic journals
Publications established in 2007
Particle physics journals